Graeme Smith is a British broadcaster born in Liverpool, England. He is currently employed by Global Radio, Graeme is a presenter on Capital Liverpool. He hosts the Drivetime show. He also hosts Outcast UK, an LGBTQ+ issues podcast. Graeme is used by the supermarket chain Asda as one of the presenters on their radio service running across UK stores.

Career
He presented his first radio show in 2001 aged 17 on the new Juice FM in Liverpool. From 2002 to 2006 he hosted the drivetime show on Galaxy 105 in Leeds aged just 19. At the age of 23 he moved to XFM London where he hosted weekday afternoons and then weekends. He left XFM London for Virgin Radio UK and remained on across the transition to Absolute Radio. He also presented various slots on LBC around this time.

On 12 March 2007 he started work on Al Gore owned Current TV which had been on air in the US since 2005 and was the second national roll out of the brand around the world. The channel launched in the UK amidst a blaze of media publicity surrounding a unique user-generated content proposition and Graeme was the first person to appear on the UK Network at launch as the presenter of Google Current and later various documentaries on gay rights, global drugs policy and a live daily current affairs and entertainment show.

References

External links

  Not The Radio TikTok
  Not The Radio YouTube

1983 births
British radio DJs
English radio DJs
Living people
Television presenters from Liverpool
Radio presenters from Liverpool